Pseudophoenix ekmanii is a palm species endemic to the Barahona Peninsula and Isla Beata in the Dominican Republic on the Caribbean island of Hispaniola.

Names
In Dominican Spanish, P. ekmanii is known as cacheo or cacheo de Oviedo. In English, the species is usually referred to as the Dominican cherry palm.

Description
It is a small tree (4 to 6 m tall), with pinnately compound leaves and solitary, swollen stems. The fruit are reddish with a diameter of about 2 cm.

Conservation
P. ekmanii was once used in palm wine production. Trees were cut down and the pith extracted, especially from the swollen portion of the stem. The sap was then extracted and fermented. As a consequence of this cutting for palm wine production, the species is considered Critically Endangered. Current threats include habitat loss from grazing and agriculture.

References

External links
 Image of Pseudophoenix ekmanii from the Palm and Cycad Society of Florida.
 Pseudophoenix ekmanii from the Palm and Cycad Society of Australia.

ekmanii
Trees of the Dominican Republic
Endemic flora of the Dominican Republic
Critically endangered plants
Taxa named by Max Burret